Nazok-e Olya (also Romanized as Nāzok-e ‘Olyā; also known as Nasik, Nāzīk, Nāzīk-e ‘Olyā, Nāzok, and Nāzok-e Bālā) is a city in, and the capital of, Aras District of Poldasht County, West Azerbaijan province, Iran. At the 2006 census, its population was 2,466 in 613 households, when it was a village in the former Poldasht District of Maku County. The following census in 2011 counted 2,761 people in 789 households, by which time the district had been separated from the county, Poldasht County established, and divided into two districts: the Central and Aras Districts. Nazok-ye Olya was elevated from village to city status and became capital of the new district. The latest census in 2016 showed a population of 2,667 people in 829 households.

References 

Poldasht County

Cities in West Azerbaijan Province

Populated places in West Azerbaijan Province

Populated places in Poldasht County